The 1981 Brisbane Rugby League premiership was the 74th season of Brisbane's semi-professional rugby league football competition. Eight teams from across Brisbane competed for the premiership, which culminated in a grand final match between the Southern Suburbs and Redcliffe clubs.

Season summary 
Teams played each other three times, with 21 rounds of competition played. It resulted in a top four of Redcliffe, Southern Suburbs, Wynnum-Manly and Eastern Suburbs.

Teams

Finals

Grand Final 

Southern Suburbs 13 (Tries: B. Sully, M. Reardon. Goals: M. Meninga 3. Field Goal: K. Spencer.)

Redcliffe 9 (Tries: I. Pearce. Goals: I. Pearce 3.)

References

Rugby league in Brisbane
Brisbane Rugby League season